MLB World Series 2009 is a baseball simulation video game developed by American studio Polarbit and published by MLB Advanced Media for iOS.  It was the first officially licensed Major League Baseball game for the platform.

References

2009 video games
Major League Baseball video games
IOS games
IOS-only games
Video games developed in the United States